The Messiah is a 1975 Italian / French film directed by Roberto Rossellini.

Cast

References

External links 

1975 films
Italian historical drama films
French historical drama films
Films directed by Roberto Rossellini
1970s Italian films
1970s French films